The Cheatham County Courthouse is a courthouse in Ashland City, Tennessee. The original seat of government for Cheatham County, the courthouse was placed on the National Register of Historic Places in 1976.

After Cheatham County was founded in 1856, plans began for a courthouse in Ashland (now Ashland City). The original courthouse was completed in 1869 for a cost of $12,000. It is a two-story, brick, rectangular structure in the Greek Revival-Italianate style.

A renovation was undertaken in the early 1900s, which added a large addition on the southwest side of the courthouse. This addition, designed by Robert E. Turberville, also has two stories. The main facade features a portico and Ionic columns.

Currently the building houses the Cheatham County courts and general sessions. The courthouse also features a front lawn that has served as a social gathering spot.

References

Buildings and structures in Cheatham County, Tennessee
National Register of Historic Places in Cheatham County, Tennessee